Venerable Adrian of Poshekhonye (died 1550) was a Russian Orthodox monk and iconographer, who was the founder and first hegumen (abbot) of the Dormition monastery in Poshekhonye, north  Yaroslavl region. He is commemorated as a saint in the Eastern Orthodox Church.

Adrian was born at Rostov the Great near the end of the sixteenth century, of pious parents named Gregory and Irene. He received monastic tonsure at the monastery of the Venerable Cornelius of Komel ("Korneliev" Monastery). There he was ordained a hierodeacon (i.e., a monastic deacon). Three years after the death of his spiritual father, St. Cornelius, he received a blessing to go and found a new monastery, dedicated to the Theotokos (Virgin Mary). The monastery was built on the river Votkha in Poshekhonye. Saint Macarius the Metropolitan of Moscow blessed the foundation and gave them a charter to that effect. He ordained Adrian a hieromonk (monastic priest) and elevated him to the rank of hegumen.

During Great Lent of 1550, in the evening on March 5, armed robbers burst into the monastery and murdered Adrian after torturing him mercilessly. He was buried by his brethren in the monastery's Temple (Church) of the prophet Elijah.

The relics of St. Adrian were uncovered on December 17, 1626, and found to be incorrupt. They were solemnly translated to the monastery church and placed in an open reliquary by the right kliros (choir) for veneration by the faithful.  His feast day is celebrated on March 5 (for those churches which follow the traditional Julian Calendar, March 5 falls on March 18 of the modern Gregorian Calendar). He is also commemorated, in common with other saints of the Yaroslavl region, on May 23 (June 5), the "Synaxis of the Saints of Rostov and Yaroslavl", and on November 19 (December 2), the feast of the Uncovering of his Relics.

External links
Monk-martyr Adrian of Poshekhonye, Yaroslavl Orthodox synaxarion
Synaxis of the Saints of Rostov and Yaroslavl
Uncovering of the relics of Monk-martyr Adrian of Poshekhonsk

15th-century births
1550 deaths
16th-century Christian saints
Russian saints of the Eastern Orthodox Church
Miracle workers